Mark Rydell (born Mortimer H. Rydell; March 23, 1929) is an American film director, producer, and actor. He has directed several Academy Award-nominated films including The Fox (1967), The Reivers (1969), Cinderella Liberty (1973), The Rose (1979), and The River (1984). He was nominated for an Academy Award for Best Director for On Golden Pond (1981).

Actor
Rydell initially trained in music. As a youth, he wanted to be a conductor.  He said he left music because of the proliferation of drugs among the musicians: "Heroin was the drug of choice," he said. "Knowing that I have an addict's personality in that a little is good but a lot is better, I knew I was in danger. So I went back to college and went to the Neighborhood Playhouse". He studied acting at The Neighborhood Playhouse School of the Theatre in New York City. His first significant roles were as Walt Johnson on The Edge of Night, and as Jeff Baker on As the World Turns, which he played from December 12, 1956, to 1962. The role of Jeff was a particularly popular role with the audience. During the series run he directed Roots off broadway in 1961.

In 1962, Rydell declined to sign another long-term contract at ATWT, and producers had his character die in a car crash. He later won plaudits for his role of violent Jewish mob kingpin Marty Augustine in Robert Altman's The Long Goodbye (1973). His most recent significant film role was in Woody Allen's Hollywood Ending (2002).

TV director
Rydell moved into directing television and soon became very successful. He did episodes of Mr. Novak, Ben Casey, The Reporter, Slattery's People, I Spy, The Wild Wild West, The Long, Hot Summer, and Gunsmoke. He said later: "I come from the school of sitting around the table for two weeks examining every detail of the material, working out relationships with the actors, so they know what they are doing, bringing them to locations, so they can get comfortable."

Feature films
Rydell's first feature as director was The Fox (1967) which was a box-office hit, in part due to its then-rare lesbian content. He signed a multi picture contract with the film's producer Raymond Stross but disliked working with him and says he ended up paying out four times his fee for the picture to get out of the contract. Nonetheless he credits Stross for starting his film career. He directed Steve McQueen in The Reivers (1969). Rydell and friend Sydney Pollack, who had known each other since they were both actors, formed a company, Sanford Productions, and  signed a six picture contract with the Mirisch Brothers. They planned to make Good Luck, Miss Wyckoff, which was eventually made in 1979 by other filmmakers.

Rydell directed John Wayne in The Cowboys (1972). He made a romantic comedy, Cinderella Liberty (1973), with James Caan and Marsha Mason. Around this time he said he did not want to make genre movies: "I want to create my own genre." He was reunited with Caan on Harry and Walter Go to New York (1976) which was a box-office flop, and directed the pilot episode of Family (1976).

Rydell directed The Rose (1979), starring Bette Midler, which was a huge hit. So too was On Golden Pond (1981), starring Henry Fonda and Katharine Hepburn, for which Rydell received an Oscar nomination as Best Director. "I'm this week's heat," he joked at the time. He was going to make a film based on the play Nuts but instead did  The River (1984), with Mel Gibson and Sissy Spacek. It was not a commercial success.  Neither was Rydell's next film, For the Boys (1991), with Caan and Midler.

Rydell made the TV movie McBride and Groom (1993) and the feature Intersection (1994). He directed the TV movies Crime of the Century (1996), which starred Isabella Rossellini and Stephen Rea, and James Dean (2001), which earned actor James Franco a Golden Globe award. Rydell also acted in the movie, playing Jack L. Warner (head of Warner Bros). He was credited as executive producer on An Unfinished Life (2005).

In 2006, Rydell directed the movie Even Money. His last credit to date was an episode of Masters of Science Fiction, "A Clean Escape".

Three years later – working with actor Martin Landau and screenwriter/playwright Lyle Kessler – he produced an education seminar, The Total Picture Seminar. The two-day event covers the disciplines of acting, directing, and writing for film. The three have worked together as a team for many decades at The Actors Studio teaching and coaching professional actors, writers, and directors. In 2010, Rydell joined the Advisory Board of Openfilm, an online video sharing site created to help aspiring independent filmmakers.

He executive produced the documentary A Coup in Camelot (2015).

Personal life
Mortimer H. Rydell was born on March 23, 1929, to a Jewish family in New York City.

Rydell married actress Joanne Linville in 1962. The couple had two children, Amy and Christopher, both actors. Rydell and Linville divorced in 1973. Rydell had another son, Alexander, from his second marriage to documentary producer Esther Rydell. That union ended in divorce in 2007.

Filmography

As director

Film
The Fox (1967)
The Reivers (1969)
The Cowboys (1972)
Cinderella Liberty (1973)
Harry and Walter Go to New York (1976)
The Rose (1979)
On Golden Pond (1981)
The River (1984)
For the Boys (1991)
Intersection (1994)
Even Money (2006)

Television
The Phil Silvers Show (episode on TV series) (1955)
Mr. Novak (episode on TV series) (1964)
Ben Casey (episodes on TV series) (1963–64)
The Reporter (episode on TV series) (1964)
Slattery's People (episode on TV series) (1965)
I Spy (episodes on TV series) (1965)
The Wild Wild West (episode on TV series) (1966)
The Long, Hot Summer (episodes on TV series) (1965–66)
The Fugitive (episode on TV series) (1966)
Gunsmoke (episodes on TV series) (1964–66)
Family (episode on TV series) (1976)
McBride and Groom (TV movie) (1993)
Crime of the Century (TV movie) (1996)
James Dean (TV movie) (2001)
Masters of Science Fiction (episode on TV mini-series) (2007)

As actor
Crime in the Streets (1956) as Lou Macklin
The Long Goodbye  (1973) as Marty Augustine
Punchline (1988) as Romeo
Havana (1990) as Meyer Lansky
A Man Is Mostly Water (2000) as Distributor
Hollywood Ending (2002) as Al
Senior Entourage (2020) as Mark

References

External links
 
 
 
The Total Picture Seminar – A Seminar with Martin Landau, Mark Rydell, and Lyle Kessler covering filmmaking.

1929 births
Living people
Film producers from New York (state)
American male film actors
American male soap opera actors
Film directors from New York City
Jewish American male actors
Male actors from New York City
Neighborhood Playhouse School of the Theatre alumni
20th-century American male actors
21st-century American Jews